Mad Nurse is a video game programmed by Simon Pick and published by Firebird Software Ltd. for the Commodore 64 and ZX Spectrum in 1984.

The plot of the game is that you control a nurse at a maternity hospital, where you have to rescue the babies who have escaped from their cots. If left alone, the babies will eat medicine bottles, electrocute themselves at electrical outlets, and fall down the elevator shaft. The gameplay has the form of a non-scrolling platformer where the nurse can use an elevator to ascend or descend platforms. If too many babies die, the nurse is fired.

Firebird initially refused to publish the game, because dying babies were too controversial, but changed their minds when their post of head of development changed hands. Some outlets also refused to sell the game.

The music in the game is adopted from Hungarian Rhapsody No. 2 by Franz Liszt (the friska in the second section) and Brahms' Lullaby by Johannes Brahms.

Development

The game's budget was £650.

References

External links
 

1984 video games
Commodore 64 games
Fictional nurses
Medical video games
Platform games
Video games about children
Video games developed in the United Kingdom
Video games featuring female protagonists
ZX Spectrum games